Jamaran (also Romanized as Jamārān) is a village in Sheykh Musa Rural District, in the Central District of Aqqala County, Golestan Province, Iran. At the 2006 census, its population was 695, in 141 families.

References 

Populated places in Aqqala County